Tooley Lake is a lake in Lincoln County, Montana at an elevation of . It is located in the West Kootenai.

Geographical Features
There is a small unnamed island located in the south part of the lake.

References

Bodies of water of Lincoln County, Montana
Lakes of Montana